Fritz Tittmann (18 July 1898 – 25 April 1945) was a German Nazi politician and SS-Brigadeführer who served as an early   Party leader in Saxony and, from 1941 to 1942, as SS and Police Leader in Nikolajew (today, Mykolaiv). He died near the end of the Second World War in unclear circumstances.

Early life 
Tittmann was born in Leipzig, attended volksschule there, followed by an apprenticeship in locksmithing. He then studied  mechanical engineering at a vocational school in Chemnitz and worked briefly as a machinist from 1913 to 1914. Shortly after the outbreak of the First World War, he joined the Imperial German Army on 21 September 1914. He served in the 105th Infantry Regiment (6th Royal Saxon) throughout the war. Serving on the western front, he was wounded three times and was awarded the Iron Cross 1st and 2nd class and the Wound Badge in silver. Hospitalized in Zwickau from April 1918, he remained in the Reichswehr until 31 August 1920 when he was discharged on a partial disability pension with the rank of Unteroffizier. Returning to civilian life, he underwent retraining to become a commercial clerk. He obtained a job as a business manager and editor for the Deutschvölkischer Schutz- und Trutzbund, the largest, most active and influential anti-semitic organization in Germany.

Nazi Party career 
In July 1921 Tittmann attended a Nazi Party meeting in Munich where Adolf Hitler spoke, and joined the Party. As an early Party member, he would later receive the Golden Party Badge. On 11 October 1921, he co-founded an Ortsgruppe (Local Group) in Zwickau. This was the first Nazi organization formed outside Bavaria. On the same day he was named Landesleiter (State Leader, equivalent to the later position of Gauleiter) for Saxony, and set about organizing and expanding the Party throughout the state. Sometime in 1923, Tittmann founded a publishing house which published the weekly (after 1932, daily) newspaper "Der Streiter," (The Fighter) in which he wrote pro-Nazi propaganda articles. 

Tittmann was also the leader of the Sturmabteilung (SA), the Party's paramilitary organization, for Saxony, Thuringia and Upper Franconia. He devoted himself to the military training of the SA to support Hitler's Bavarian forces in preparation for the expected putsch against the Weimar Republic. In September 1923, Tittmann moved his SA headquarters to Hof just over the border in Bavaria. 

Following the failed Beer Hall Putsch of 9 November 1923 and the subsequent outlawing of the Nazi Party, Tittmann founded the Zwickau branch of the Nazi front organization, the Völkisch-Social Bloc, serving as its leader in Saxony until August 1924 when he was replaced by Martin Mutschmann. During this period, Tittmann also led units of the Frontbann, in place of the banned SA. In the parliamentary election in May 1924, he was elected on the National Socialist Freedom Party (NSFP) ticket as a deputy to the Reichstag, serving until the dissolution of October 1924. 

After the Nazi Party was re-founded, he enrolled on 25 July 1925 (membership number 12,225). He served as Deputy Landesleiter of Saxony under Mutschmann from August 1925. Then, from 1926 to December 1927, he served under Mutschmann as leader of the Untergau Zwickau. From October 1926 to May 1929 he and Hellmuth von Mücke sat in the Landtag of Saxony; they were the first two members of the Nazi Party in a German parliament. Tittmann was again a member of the SA from 1925, and led the Zwickau SA-Standarte from 1927 to 1930. In 1930 he moved to Brandenburg and left the SA to enroll in the SS (membership number 3,925), serving until 1931 as SS-Standartenfuhrer for Brandenburg-Süd. From April 1932 to October 1933 he was a member of the Landtag of Prussia and from 1932 to 1936 Gau Inspector in Gau Kurmark. 

After the Nazi seizure of power, Tittmann was appointed acting Burgermeister (Mayor) of Treuenbrietzen in 1934 and remained honorary mayor until 1941. From September 1933 to May 1936 he was the Reich Representative of the Party for Gaue Berlin, Kurmark and Silesia, and from May 1934 served on the staff of Deputy Führer Rudolf Hess. At the Nuremberg rallies of 1933 and 1934, Tittmann held the position of Press Chief. Reelected as a Reichstag deputy in November 1933 from electoral constituency 4, Potsdam I, he retained this seat until the end of the Nazi regime.

On 20 April 1938, Tittmann rejoined the SS with the rank of SS-Oberführer. He served in the office of the Reichsführer-SS  Heinrich Himmler. There, he was made Plenipotentiary for Ethnic German Issues, and the SS Ethnic German Main Office (VoMi) Representative to the Reich Organization Leadership Office, headed by Robert Ley. On 7 October 1939, Himmler was named Reich Commissioner for the Consolidation of German Nationhood (RKFDV) and created a new SS office for this function. On 9 November 1940, Tittmann was promoted to SS-Brigadeführer and, on 1 July 1941, Himmler charged him with responsibility for representing the ethnic German interests of both VoMi and RKFDV to Ley's office.

Second World War 
After the German attack on the Soviet Union, Tittmann underwent training in police duties and, on 22 October 1941, was appointed the first SS and Police Leader (SSPF) for Nikolajew in the Reichskommissariat Ukraine. During the winter of 1941–1942, he was involved in recruiting ethnic German deserters, mostly from Romanian units, for a new Waffen-SS unit then being formed (7th SS Volunteer Mountain Division Prinz Eugen). By May 1942, he had enlisted around 1,000 soldiers and, though these recruits were described as "volunteers," they were often forcibly coerced into service. On 22 August 1942, Tittmann was replaced in Nikolajew by SS-Brigadeführer Waldemar Wappenhans, and was reassigned to the staff of the Higher SS and Police Leader (HSSPF) for "Russland-Süd," SS-Obergruppenführer Hans-Adolf Prützmann, in Kiev. 

Although Tittmann’s tenure in Nikolajew only began after the Nikolaev massacre of September 1941, it coincided with the so-called “second wave” of Holocaust murders.

By the spring of 1942 almost no Jews remained alive in German-occupied Right-Bank and Left-Bank Ukraine. Meanwhile, in western Ukraine the perpetrators started classifying and organizing the surviving Jews according to their presumed ability to work. As a result, the murder of women and children intensified … In Volhynia, Podilia, and the Mykolaiv region, mass executions were restarted at almost the same time. All the Jews in the latter region were killed by 1 April. The most apocalyptic period was yet to come. In July 1942 approximately 600,000 Jews were still alive in Ukraine. Most of them fell victim to the extreme murder campaign that took place between July and November 1942. Almost every day German police, aided by Ukrainian auxiliary policemen, killed thousands of Jews, especially in August and September 1942.

In September 1944, however, Tittmann's career was derailed when he received a severe reprimand from Himmler for having diverted three Waffen-SS personnel away from their official duties to assist him with personal matters. In the same month he was punitively transferred to northern Italy, where he was to supervise the construction of defensive positions.

Tittmann died on 25 April 1945 in Treuenbrietzen. There are differing accounts of his death. One version is that he was killed in action fighting the Red Army. Another is that he perished with his family in an air raid. According to another source, Tittmann killed his wife, three children, sister-in-law, mother-in-law and himself in a murder–suicide, rather than surrendering to the advancing Red Army.

See also 
 Holocaust in Ukraine
 Volksdeutsche

References

Sources

External links 
 
 Fritz Tittmann in Online Saxon Biography

1898 births
1945 deaths
Gauleiters
German casualties of World War II
Holocaust perpetrators in Ukraine
Members of the Landtag of Prussia
Members of the Landtag of Saxony
Members of the Reichstag of Nazi Germany
Members of the Reichstag of the Weimar Republic
National Socialist Freedom Movement politicians
Nazi Party officials
Nazi Party politicians
Nazi propagandists
People from Leipzig
Recipients of the Iron Cross (1914), 1st class
Recipients of the Iron Cross (1914), 2nd class
Reichswehr personnel
SS-Brigadeführer
SS and Police Leaders
Sturmabteilung officers
20th-century German newspaper publishers (people)
Unsolved deaths
German Army personnel of World War I